Giovanni Agucchi was an Italian engraver of the 16th century Renaissance period. He was a native of Milan. He is known for an engraving of the cathedral of Milan.

References

Italian engravers
Artists from Milan
16th-century Italian artists